Alvin Fay Harlow (March 10, 1875 – November 17, 1963) was an American writer and biographer. A historian, Harlow's writing focused often on America infrastructure, including transportation and communication, and New York history. He was also biographer, serving as official biographer of Eddie Foy Sr. and Jefferson De Angelis. He also wrote hundreds of entries for the Dictionary of American Biography and Dictionary of American History. His style was described as "homespun" and "factual."

Early life and education

Alvin Fay Harlow was born in Sedalia, Missouri on March 10, 1875. Harlow's father was an express messenger for the Missouri–Kansas–Texas Railroad. 

As a child, Harlow was interested in the history of the American West, including the James–Younger Gang. As a little boy, his family moved to Kentucky, living in Covington. The family moved to North Vernon, Indiana when Harlow was 12. 

He attended Franklin College, graduating in 1899.

Career and life

After college, he worked at an engraving company in Indianapolis. In 1908, he became secretary-treasurer of the Grand View Coal & Timber Company. During his time with the Company, he worked in Appalachia, where he created educational films about Appalachian people.  

He started working in advertising and journalism in 1913.  He wrote business news articles and advertising copy for magazines. 

Harlow shifted his writing to focus on history, documenting detailed, specialized books about various facets of American culture. In 1926, he published his first book Old Towpaths. The book explored the history of canals in the United States. His second book, Old Waybills: The Romance of the Express Companies, was published in 1934 and studied express companies – reflecting on his father's career. He also wrote books about the history of postal carrier bags, the Bowery, stamp collecting, and a children's book about the use of the telegraph in the American Civil War. 

He also wrote biographies, including being the official biographer of Eddie Foy Sr. and Jefferson De Angelis. He also wrote biographies about Joel Chandler Harris, Bret Harte, Theodore Roosevelt and the Ringling brothers. Harlow also wrote over 300 articles for the Dictionary of American History and over 100 articles for the Dictionary of American Biography. 

Harlow married Dora Shockley. The couple did research together, spending long days at the New York Public Library.

Later life and death

Harlow was awarded an honorary degree from Franklin College. He was an honorary member of the New York Historical Society. He was a professional member of the Authors League of America and the Society of American Historians.  

He died at Riverdale Nursing Home in the Bronx on November 17, 1963. Harlow is buried at Chattanooga Memorial Park in Chattanooga, Tennessee.

Legacy

A decade worth of Harlow's manuscripts are held in the collection of the University of Tulsa's McFarlin Library.

Works by Alvin F. Harlow

with Kennedy, Millard Fillmore. Schoolmaster of Yesterday: A Three-Generation Story, 1820-1919. New York: Whittlesey House, McGraw-Hill Book Co., 1940.
Brass-pounders: Young Telegraphers of the Civil War. Denver: Sage Books, 1962.
 Old Bowery Days: The Chronicles of a Famous Street. New York: D. Appleton & Co., 1931.

References

1875 births
1963 deaths
People from Sedalia, Missouri
People from the Bronx
20th-century American biographers
20th-century American historians
American male non-fiction writers
Franklin College (Indiana) alumni
People from North Vernon, Indiana
Historians from Indiana
Historians from New York (state)
20th-century American male writers